Imre Balog (born October 28, 1991) is a Hungarian chess grandmaster. Balog won the Arad Open in 2011, and won it for a second time in 2012. He earned his International Master title in 2007 and gained his grandmaster norms in 2010 and was awarded the grandmaster title in early 2011.

References

External links
 
 
 
 
 

1991 births
Living people
Chess grandmasters
Hungarian chess players